The 2014–15 St. Bonaventure Bonnies men's basketball team represented St. Bonaventure University during the 2014–15 NCAA Division I men's basketball season. The Bonnies, led by eighth year head coach Mark Schmidt, played their home games at the Reilly Center and were members of the Atlantic 10 Conference. They finished the season 18–13, 10–8 in A-10 play to finish in a three way tie for sixth place. They advanced to the quarterfinals of the A-10 Tournament where they lost to Dayton. For the second consecutive year, the Bonnies accumulated a winning record but did not receive an invite the postseason; the team failed to qualify for the National Invitation Tournament and, in accordance with school policy, preemptively ruled out participating in either the College Basketball Invitational or CollegeInsider.com Postseason Tournament.

Previous season 
The Bonnies finished the season with an overall record of 18–15, with a record of 6–10 in the Atlantic 10 regular season for a ninth-place finish. In the 2014 Atlantic 10 tournament, the Bonnies were defeated by Saint Joseph's the semifinals. Despite an overall winning record that included an upset over top-ranked Saint Louis in the A-10 tournament quarterfinals, the Bonnies were not invited to a postseason bid due to an inability to come to an agreement with the College Basketball Invitational.

Off season

Departures

Incoming Transfers

Incoming recruits

Roster

Schedule

|-
!colspan=9 style="background:#7B3F00; color:#FFFFFF;"|  Exhibition

|-
!colspan=9 style="background:#7B3F00; color:#FFFFFF;"|  Non-conference regular season

|-
!colspan=9 style="background:#7B3F00; color:#FFFFFF;"|  Atlantic 10 regular season

|-
!colspan=9 style="background:#7B3F00; color:#FFFFFF;"| Atlantic 10 tournament

See also
 2014–15 St. Bonaventure Bonnies women's basketball team

References

St. Bonaventure Bonnies men's basketball seasons
St. Bonaventure